Blairstown Historic District is located in Blairstown, Warren County, New Jersey. The district was added to the National Register of Historic Places on February 16, 2007, for its significance in architecture, commerce, and community development. It includes a grist mill originally built in 1825 that once served as town's library and is now part of Blair Academy.

Gallery of contributing properties

See also
National Register of Historic Places listings in Warren County, New Jersey

References

External links
 

Blairstown, New Jersey
Houses on the National Register of Historic Places in New Jersey
Queen Anne architecture in New Jersey
Italianate architecture in New Jersey
National Register of Historic Places in Warren County, New Jersey
Historic districts on the National Register of Historic Places in New Jersey
Houses in Warren County, New Jersey
New Jersey Register of Historic Places